Eduard López López is a Grand Prix motorcycle racer from Spain.

Career statistics

By season

Races by year
(key)

References

External links
 Profile on motogp.com

Spanish motorcycle racers
Motorcycle racers from Catalonia
Living people
1992 births
125cc World Championship riders